The Merrimac Town Forest is a heavily forested area of the western half of the town of Merrimac, Massachusetts, west of Merrimac Square and north of Interstate 495, which was set aside as a town forest.

Forests of Massachusetts
Urban forests in the United States
Protected areas of Essex County, Massachusetts